The Latvia national rugby sevens team is a national rugby sevens side, representing Latvia. They currently play in the Rugby Europe Sevens Trophy tournament.

Latvian rugby received a surprise boost when they qualified for the Rugby World Cup Sevens in 1993. At the time, there were only two pitches in the country, both of which spent much of their time under snow.

Tournament history

Rugby World Cup Sevens

1993 World Cup Sevens: Pool A
{| class="wikitable" style="text-align: center;"
|-
!width="170"|Team
!width="40"|Pld
!width="40"|W
!width="40"|D
!width="40"|L
!width="40"|PF
!width="40"|PA
!width="40"|+/-
!width="40"|Pts
|- bgcolor="#ccffcc"
|align=left| 
|5||5||0||0||175||43||132||15
|- bgcolor="#ccffcc"
|align=left| 
|5||4||0||1||150||60||90||13
|- bgcolor="#ccccff"
|align=left| 
|5||3||0||2||135||78||57||11
|- bgcolor="#ffcccc"
|align=left| 
|5||2||0||3||67||118||-51||9
|-
|align=left| 
|5||1||0||4||44||133||-89||7
|-
|align=left| 
|5||0||0||5||29||168||-139||5
|}

Results

References

Rugby union in Latvia
National rugby sevens teams
R